Emmanouil Fragkos is a Greek politician currently serving as a Member of the European Parliament for the far-right Greek Solution party.

Study 
Emmanouil Fragkos graduated from the School of Veterinary Medicine of Aristotle University of Thessaloniki in November 2016.

Election 
Emmanouil Fragkos was a candidate with the Greek Solution party on the elections of the European Parliament of 2019 under the name Fragkos (Fragkoulis) Emmanouil.  The party received enough votes to elect a representative, with Kyriakos Velopoulos, the head of the party receiving the most votes and Emmanouil Fragkos receiving the second highest amount. After the national elections, Kyriakos Velopoulos was elected in the National Parliament and therefore forfeited his position in the European Parliament, handing the position to Fragkos.

References

Living people
MEPs for Greece 2019–2024
Greek Solution MEPs
Greek Solution politicians
Politicians from Chios
1993 births